The Middle Watch is a 1940 British comedy film, directed by Thomas Bentley and starring  Jack Buchanan, Greta Gynt, Fred Emney and Kay Walsh. It was produced by Associated British Picture Corporation at their Welwyn Studios. It was based on a play of the same title by Ian Hay and Stephen King-Hall which had previously been adapted as a film in 1930, and which was adapted again in 1958.

Synopsis
This comedy film features battleship Captain Maitland (Jack Buchanan) celebrating a bon voyage party. He later discovers two stowaways, attractive young women, but much too late to turn back. Despite the captain's efforts to hide them, they are soon discovered, with predictable consequences.

Cast
 Jack Buchanan as Captain Maitland
 Greta Gynt as Mary Carlton
 Fred Emney as Admiral Sir Reginald Hewett
 Kay Walsh as Fay Featon
 David Hutcheson as Commander Baddeley
 Leslie Fuller as Marine Ogg
 Bruce Seton as Captain Randall
 Martita Hunt as Lady Elizabeth Hewett
 Louise Hampton as Charlotte Hopkinson
 Romney Brent as Ah Fong
 Jean Gillie as Betty Hewett
 Ronald Shiner as the ship's engineer
 Reginald Purdell as Corporal Duckett

References

Bibliography
 Mackenzie, S. P. British War Films, 1939-1945. Continuum, 2003.

External links
 
 
 

1940 films
1940 comedy films
British black-and-white films
1940s English-language films
Films directed by Thomas Bentley
British films based on plays
Films based on works by Ian Hay
British comedy films
Films shot at Welwyn Studios
Films set in England
World War II films made in wartime
Seafaring films
Films with screenplays by J. Lee Thompson